Doliella nitens is a species of sea snail, a marine gastropod mollusk in the family Pyramidellidae, the pyrams and their allies.

Description
The length of the shell varies between 2 mm and 2.9 mm. The white shell is thin, semitransparent, very glossy and shows microscopic growth lines. There are three whorls besides the protoconch. The suture is very narrow, slightly excavated and margined by the overlapping of the whorls. The umbilicus is lacking. The columellar tooth is represented by a broad, but not conspicuous, fold.

Distribution
This marine species occurs in the following locations:
 Atlantic Europe
 Portuguese Exclusive Economic Zone
 Spanish Exclusive Economic Zone
 United Kingdom Exclusive Economic Zone
 Azores Exclusive Economic Zone
 Canary Islands
 Cape Verdes
 European waters (ERMS scope)
 Mediterranean Sea :  Greek Exclusive Economic Zone

References

 Giannuzzi-Savelli R., Pusateri F., Micali, P., Nofroni, I., Bartolini S. (2014). Atlante delle conchiglie marine del Mediterraneo, vol. 5 (Heterobranchia). Edizioni Danaus, Palermo, pp. 1– 111 with 41 unnumbered plates (figs. 1-363), appendix pp. 1–91 page(s): 58, appendix p. 15, 82

External links
 To CLEMAM
 To Encyclopedia of Life
 To World Register of Marine Species

Pyramidellidae
Gastropods described in 1870
Molluscs of the Atlantic Ocean
Molluscs of the Mediterranean Sea
Molluscs of the Azores
Molluscs of the Canary Islands
Gastropods of Cape Verde
Invertebrates of Europe